Minka Dumonte Kelly (born June 24, 1980) is an American actress and model. Her first starring role was in the NBC drama series Friday Night Lights (2006–2009) and she has also appeared on the shows Parenthood (2010–2011), Charlie's Angels (2011), and Almost Human (2013). From 2018 to 2021, Kelly portrayed Dawn Granger / Dove on the DC Universe / HBO Max series Titans.

Early life
Kelly was born in Los Angeles. She is the only child of former Aerosmith guitarist Rick Dufay and the late Maureen Dumont Kelly. She was raised by her mother, who worked various jobs. Kelly and her mother moved to various communities before settling in Albuquerque, New Mexico by the time Kelly was in junior high school. Kelly's mother Maureen died in 2008, at age 51, from colon cancer. Minka Kelly has French, Irish, and Dutch-Indonesian ancestry.

Career
After graduating from Valley High School in Albuquerque, New Mexico, Kelly returned to live in Los Angeles. While on a test shoot for a modeling agency, she was approached by a former Playboy Playmate who was interested in managing her. She helped Kelly find work as a receptionist at a surgeon's office who would provide Kelly breast augmentation in exchange for hours worked. Kelly decided against getting the surgery and was fired. Her exposure to the medical field spurred her to attend school for a year studying to become a surgeon's assistant; afterwards she worked as a scrub technician. During the four years she spent in the vocation she continued auditioning for film and television roles.

In 2003, Kelly made her acting debut as an extra in the short film The Turbo Charged Prelude for 2 Fast 2 Furious, a six-minute introduction to the action film 2 Fast 2 Furious. This was followed by a special guest appearance on Cracking Up. She has since appeared in a number of television shows such as Entourage, Drake & Josh, and American Dreams. In 2005, Kelly landed a three episode recurring role in The WB comedy series What I Like About You.

In April 2006, Kelly was cast as a series regular on the NBC drama series Friday Night Lights. The show was based on the high school football film of the same name; it follows a high school football team in the fictional small town of Dillon. Kelly played the role of high school student and cheerleader Lyla Garrity. In preparation for her role as a cheerleader she trained with the Pflugerville High School cheerleading squad. The series premiered on October 3, 2006, with Kelly receiving praise for her performance with The New York Times calling her performance "heartbreaking." At the end of the show's third season Kelly left the series as her character left for college.

In 2006, Kelly starred in the horror slasher film The Pumpkin Karver as Tammy Boyles, and had a bit role in State's Evidence. In 2007, she reunited with Friday Night Lights creator Peter Berg in the film The Kingdom in a cameo role as Ms. Ross alongside Jamie Foxx and Jennifer Garner. In 2009, she also appeared in the final scene of the film 500 Days of Summer as Autumn, a potential new love interest to Joseph Gordon-Levitt's character.

In August 2008, Kelly had been cast as the protagonist in The CW pilot series Body Politic. She played the role of Francesca "Frankie" Foster, who moves to Washington, D.C. to work for a senator and befriends a group of eager up-and-comers. Despite acclaim from critics who viewed the pilot, The CW did not pick up the series. Kelly also appeared in the pilot for the short-lived CBS comedy series Mad Love playing the role of Kate, a Midwestern girl who falls in love with Henry at the top of the Empire State Building. When the series was picked up, Kelly was replaced by Sarah Chalke.

In April 2010, Kelly appeared on the NBC drama series Parenthood. She played the role of a behavioral aide to the child character Max who is diagnosed with Asperger syndrome. Kelly went on to appear in nine episodes of the show before making her final appearance in the episode "Taking the Leap" which aired on March 29, 2011. In the same year, Kelly was named "Sexiest Woman Alive" in the annual Esquire magazine feature. She accepted a role in the Off Broadway play Love, Loss, and What I Wore for an April 27–29, 2011, run with Conchata Ferrell, AnnaLynne McCord, Anne Meara, and B. Smith.

In December 2010, ABC announced that Kelly was cast in the planned reboot of the crime drama series Charlie's Angels. She played the role of street racer Eve French. The pilot was filmed in March 2011 and the series was picked up on May 13, 2011. Charlie's Angels premiered on September 22, 2011, to over 8.76 million viewers. The series received unanimously negative reviews from critics. Despite a planned 13 episodes, ABC cancelled the series after the premiere of the fourth episode due to low ratings. The series concluded on November 10, 2011.

Kelly starred in the 2011 thriller The Roommate as a college freshman whose roommate, portrayed by Leighton Meester, has an obsession with her that turns violent. Although released to generally negative reviews, the film went on to make over $15.6 million in its opening weekend and over $40 million worldwide.

Variety announced that Kelly was cast as the lead in the mystery comedy movie Searching for Sonny. The film follows two reunited friends who are suspects in a murder mystery that is similar to a play in which they appeared during high school. Production took place in May and June 2010 in Fort Worth, Texas. The film won the "Best Narrative Feature" Award at the Festivus Film Festival.

She joined an eight-day, four-country United Service Organizations tour in December 2011 with Chairman of the Joint Chiefs of Staff General Martin Dempsey, Robert Horry, Jordin Sparks, Thomas Miles, and Sergeant Major Bryan Battaglia. In February 2012, she was one of the celebrities who modeled in red dresses for The Heart Truth Red Dress Collection show, part of New York Fashion Week. She wore a Diane von Fürstenberg dress. In June 2012, Kelly appeared in the music video for "One More Night" by Maroon 5. In 2013, Kelly appeared in the film The Butler as Jacqueline Kennedy Onassis.

In September 2017, it was announced that Kelly had been cast on the DC Universe series Titans in a recurring role as Dawn Granger / Dove. The series premiered on October 12, 2018. Kelly was promoted to a series regular for the second season in September 2019. In May 2018, Kelly appeared in the video game Detroit: Become Human as North, the right-hand woman and potential love interest of protagonist Markus.

Kelly will co-star alongside Maggie Grace and Dermot Mulroney in the upcoming psychological thriller Blackwater Lane, an adaptation of the 2017 novel The Breakdown by B.A. Paris.

Personal life
Kelly enjoys cooking and baking. She graduated from the New School of Cooking in Culver City, California, in June 2015.

Filmography

Film

Television

Music videos

Video games

References

External links

 
 
 

Living people
21st-century American actresses
Actresses from Albuquerque, New Mexico
Actresses from Los Angeles
American film actresses
American people of Dutch-Indonesian descent
American people of French descent
American people of Irish descent
American stage actresses
American television actresses
American video game actresses
1980 births